Bokeh is the aesthetic quality of out-of-focus areas in a photographic image.

Bokeh may also refer to:

 Bokeh, Iran, a village near Tehran, Iran
 Bokeh Kosang, a Taiwanese actor and singer
 Bokeh (film), a 2017 Sci-fi/Fantasy film
 Bokeh (library), an interactive visualization library for modern web browsers
 Bokeh (software), a CMS

See also 
 Boke (disambiguation)
 Bouquet (disambiguation)